Madhubani Lok Sabha constituency is one of the 40 Lok Sabha (parliamentary) constituencies in Bihar state in eastern India.

Assembly segments
Presently, Madhubani Lok Sabha constituency comprises the following six Vidhan Sabha segments after reorganisation in 1976:

Before 1976, Madhubani assembly segment formed part of eastern Lok Sabha constituency of the district of same name, but after 1976 the eastern Lok Sabha constituency was renamed as Jhanjharpur because  Madhubani assembly segment was taken out of it to be merged into former Jainagar Lok Sabha constituency. Jainagar Lok Sabha constituency included western assembly segments of Madhubani district besides Jale assembly segment from Darbhanga district. After inclusion of Madhubani assembly segment, Jainagar Lok Sabha constituency was renamed as Madhubani and Ladania CD block and adjoining areas were taken out of it to be merged into newly formed Jhanjharpur Lok Sabha constituency in order to compensate for the loss of Madhubani assembly segment. After this reorganisation, communist vote bank in the district was bifurcated and CPI had to face greater difficulties in winning the eastern Lok Sabha constituency of this district which was won by CPI candidate Bhogendra Jha in 1967 and 1971.

Members of Parliament
Before reorganisation in 1976, the following members were elected to Madhubani seat which comprised eastern part of Madhubani district including the district headquarters:

1952: Anirudha Sinha, Indian National Congress (Darbhanga East seat)
1957: Anirudha Sinha, Indian National Congress
1962: Yogendra Jha, Praja Socialist Party
1967: Shiva Chandra Jha, Samyukta Socialist Party
1971: Jagannath Mishra, Indian National Congress

After reorganisation in 1976, the following members were elected to Madhubani seat, which comprised western part of Madhubani district formerly known as Jainagar Lok Sabha constituency (the eastern constituency of the district renamed as Jhanjharpur in 1976):

^ by-poll

Election results

2019

2014

See also
 Madhubani district
 List of Constituencies of the Lok Sabha

References

Lok Sabha constituencies in Bihar
Politics of Madhubani district
Politics of Darbhanga district